Shuricheh-ye Sofla (also Romanized as Shūrīcheh-ye Soflá; also known as Shūrījeh-ye Pā’īn, New Shurijāh, Sehpanja, Shūrīcheh, Shūrījeh, and Shūrījeh-ye Soflá) is a village in Pol Khatun Rural District, Marzdaran District, Sarakhs County, Razavi Khorasan Province, Iran. At the 2006 census, its population was 329, in 74 families.

References 

Populated places in Sarakhs County